Maanasaveena is a 1976 Indian Malayalam film directed by Babu Nanthankode. The film stars Madhu, Jayabharathi, Adoor Bhasi and Prameela in the lead roles. The film has musical score by M. L. Srikanth.

Cast

Madhu
Jayabharathi
Adoor Bhasi
Prameela
T. R. Omana
Raghavan
Unnimary
Bahadoor
Kuthiravattam Pappu
Vincent

Soundtrack
The music was composed by M. L. Srikanth and the lyrics were written by Sreekumaran Thampi.

References

External links
 

1976 films
1970s Malayalam-language films